A plebiscite on the equal representation of men and women in the Nunavut Legislative Assembly was held on 26 May 1997 in the area of the Northwest Territories that was to be split off into the new territory of Nunavut. The proposal was rejected by 57.37% of voters, with a voter turnout of just 38.9%.

Results

See also
List of Northwest Territories plebiscites
List of Northwest Territories general elections

References

Referendums in the Northwest Territories 
Referendums in Nunavut
1997 referendums
1997 in Nunavut
Gender equality
Women in Nunavut
May 1997 events in Canada